Chris Heister (born Gun Christina Heister; 18 September 1950, in Östhammar) is a Swedish Moderate Party politician and former Leader of the Opposition on Stockholm County Council. She was elected to the Riksdag in 1991 and served until 2002. 1999–2003 she was deputy chairman of the party. In 2002, she chose to step down from the Riksdag to pursue a career in Stockholm's local politics. Having experience as a health spokesman in the Rikdag, she is very active on health issues - the main function of Stockholm County Council.

Heister was appointed governor of Västerbotten County in 2008 and served in this capacity until 2012. From 1 February 2012 to 31 August 2017, she served as governor of Stockholm County.

References

1950 births
Living people
Members of the Riksdag from the Moderate Party
Municipal commissioners of Sweden
Women mayors of places in Sweden
Governors of Stockholm County
Governors of Västerbotten County
Women members of the Riksdag
Members of the Riksdag 2002–2006
21st-century Swedish women politicians
Women county governors of Sweden